Berihu Aregawi (born 28 February 2001) is an Ethiopian long-distance runner. He placed fourth in the 10,000 metres at the 2020 Tokyo Olympics. Aregawi won the silver medal for the men's race at the 2023 World Cross Country Championships. He is the world record holder for the 5 kilometres road race, set on 31 December 2021 in Barcelona.

At age 17, Aregawi earned bronze in the 10,000 m at the 2018 World Under-20 Championships. He also holds the Ethiopian record in the 10 kilometres.

Career
Berihu Aregawi was the bronze medalist in the 10,000 metres at the 2018 World U20 Championships in Tampere behind Rhonex Kipruto and Jacob Kiplimo. He won the 3000 metres race at the African Youth Games that year. He then went to Argentina for the Summer Youth Olympics held in Buenos Aires and placed second in the combined 3000 m event.

In November 2019, Aregawi won the Great Ethiopian Run (10 kilometres road race).

On 8 June 2021, he finished third in the Ethiopian trial behind Selemon Barega and Yomif Kejelcha in the 10,000 m to effectively seal his place at the delayed 2020 Tokyo Olympics. Aregawi finished fourth on his Olympic debut in the 10,000 metres race behind Barega who won gold.

On 31 December 2021, Aregawi set a world record in the 5 km run at the Cursa dels Nassos 5K in Barcelona in a time of 12 minutes 49 seconds, improving previous mark of Joshua Cheptegei by 2 seconds. He had 38 second margin of victory.

At the 2022 World Indoor Championships in Belgrade, he was eliminated in the heats of the 3000 m event. Aregawi finished seventh in the 10,000 m race at the outdoor World Championships held in Eugene, Oregon that year.

In February 2023, he won the silver medal on a 10 km course at the World Cross Country Championships in Bathurst, Australia with a time of 29:26. The winner was Jacob Kiplimo in 29:17. On 11 March, Aregawi narrowly missed by nine seconds Rhonex Kipruto's 10 km world record in Laredo, Spain, clocking an Ethiopian record and the second-fastest time in history of 26:33.

Achievements

International competitions

Personal bests
 3000 metres – 7:26.81 (Monaco 2022)
 3000 metres indoor – 7:26.20 (Karlsruhe 2022)
 5000 metres – 12:50.05 (Eugene 2022)
 10000 metres – 26:46.13 (Hengelo 2022)
Road
 5 km - 12:49 (Barcelona 2021) World record
 10 km - 26:33 (Laredo 2023)

Circuit wins and titles, National titles
  Diamond League champion 5000 metres: 2021
 2021: Zürich Weltklasse (5km)
 2022: Eugene Prefontaine Classic (5000m)
 Ethiopian Championships
 10,000 metres: 2021

References

2001 births
Living people
Ethiopian male long-distance runners
Athletes (track and field) at the 2018 Summer Youth Olympics
Athletes (track and field) at the 2020 Summer Olympics
Athletes (track and field) at the 2018 African Youth Games
Olympic athletes of Ethiopia
Diamond League winners
21st-century Ethiopian people